
Gmina Rogóźno is a rural gmina (administrative district) in Grudziądz County, Kuyavian-Pomeranian Voivodeship, in north-central Poland.

Villages
Gmina Rogóźno contains the villages and settlements of Białochowo, Budy, Bukowiec, Gubiny, Kłódka, Rogóźno, Rogóźno-Zamek, Skurgwy, Szembruczek, Szembruk and Zarośle.

Neighbouring gminas
Gmina Rogóźno is bordered by the city of Grudziądz and by the gminas of Gardeja, Grudziądz, Gruta, Łasin and Sadlinki.

References
Polish official population figures 2006

Rogozno
Grudziądz County